Evocabank is an Armenian commercial bank with headquarters in Yerevan.

As of 17 January 2023, Mareta Gevorkyan owns 100% of the ordinary shares, as well as 100% of preferred shares issued in 2016, 99.9% of preferred shares issued in 2020 and 100% of preferred shares issued in 2022.

Evocabank provides fast and innovative services through its mobile application EvocaTOUCH.

History

1990: The bank was founded as “Prometheus Commercial Bank". 
2000: Accessed the S.W.I.F.T. system.
2005: Became a shareholder of "Armenian Card" CJSC, and a full member of "ArCa" payment system.
2006: The bank was granted the status of an affiliated member of the "MasterCard Europe" system. The bank started issuing "Maestro", "MasterCard Standard", "MasterCard Gold", "MasterCard Business" banking cards.
2008: The bank issued its own bonds which were privately placed.
2017: The bank has been renamed to Evocabank, changing its strategy and business model, and moving to mobile-first format. Joined in VISA payment system. Introduced SingleTOUCH online loan.
2018: Global Finance magazine named Evocabank The Best Consumer Digital Bank in Armenia for the second year in a row. ArCa-MIR Card and Shopping Card were introduced. On the occasion of May holidays, a fastive open-air concert was organized.
2019:Evocabank Board Deputy Chairman Karen Yeghiazaryan has been appointed chairman of the board. Visa Infinite card has been presented. Bank became the general sponsor of Eurovision 2019 broadcasting.
2020: Global Banking and Finance Review magazine named Evocabank The Best Digital Bank in Armenia for the second consecutive year. SME Banking Club named Evocabank the Best Mobile Bank in Armenia. Global Finance magazine named Evocabank The Best Consumer Digital Bank in Armenia for the forth year in a row.  
2021: SME Banking Club named Evocabank the Best Mobile Bank for businesses in Armenia in the CIS and the Caucasus. Awwwards team has granted Evocabank's new website 2 honorable mentions: Mobile Excellence Award and Honors, to reward for the talent and efforts, convenience, efficiency and compliance with best practices criteria. Global Banking & Finance Awards announced Evocabank The Best Digital Bank in Armenia for the third consecutive year. Global Finance magazine named Evocabank The Best Consumer Digital Bank in Armenia for the fifth year in a row.
2022: Visa International awarded Evocabank a prize for Strong Visa Premium Issuance. Global Finance magazine named Evocabank The Best SME Bank in Armenia.

Branches 

Yerevan, Armenia
 "Head office": 44/2 Hanrapetutyan
 "Paronyan" branch: 15/3 Paronyan Street.
 "Kasyan" branch: 5 Kasyan Street.
 "Tumanyan" branch: 15 Tumanyan Street.
 "Azatutyan 12" branch: 12 Liberty Avenue.
 "Garegin Nzhdeh" branch: 9 Garegin Nzhdeh Street.
 "Davtashen" branch: 32/8 Tigran Petrosyan Street.
 "Erebuni" branch: 76 Gajegortsneri Street.
 "Kievyan" branch: 2 Kievyan Street.
 "Malatia" branch: 134/8 Zoravar Andraniki Street.
 "Nor Nork" branch: 14/9 Gai Avenue.

Abovyan, Armenia 
 "Kotayk" branch: 1/2 Ogostosi 23 Street.

Gyumri, Armenia
 "Gyumri" branch: 63/1 Rustaveli Street.

Vanadzor, Armenia
 "Vanadzor" branch: 34 Gr. Lusavorich Street.

Trivia 
Evocabank published a sticker pack called "Evoji" for WhatsApp and iMessage in cooperation with Sticker Maker in July, 2019.

See also

Economy of Armenia
List of banks in Armenia

References

Banks of Armenia
Yerevan
Banks established in 1990
Armenian companies established in 1990